Monoculus is a genus of succulent plants.

Monoculus (Latin for "one-eyed") may also refer to:

John fitzRichard, Anglo-Norman nobleman nicknamed Monoculus
Otto II, Duke of Brunswick-Göttingen (c. 1380–1463), nicknamed Monoculus
Raymond IV, Count of Toulouse (c. 1041–1105), nicknamed Monoculus
Peter Monoculus (died 1185), Cistercian abbot
Monoculus, the journal of the World Association of Copepodologists

See also
 List of people known as the One-Eyed

Lists of people by nickname